The 1899–1900 Irish Cup was the twentieth edition of the premier knock-out cup competition in Irish football. 

Cliftonville won the tournament for the fourth time, defeating Bohemians 2–1 in the final.

Results

First round

|}

Quarter-finals

|}

Replay

|}

Semi-finals

|}

Final

References

External links
 Northern Ireland Cup Finals. Rec.Sport.Soccer Statistics Foundation (RSSSF)

Irish Cup seasons
1899–1900 domestic association football cups
1899–1900 in Irish association football